Asura dasara is a moth of the  family Erebidae. It is found in the north-western Himalayas.

References

dasara
Moths described in 1859
Moths of Asia